Dormer River is a stream in Alberta, Canada.

Dormer River was so named on account of ridges which rise like a dormer.

See also
List of rivers of Alberta

References

Rivers of Alberta